Rudravaram is a village in Guntur district of the Indian state of Andhra Pradesh. It is located in Muppalla mandal of Rudravaram revenue division. The waste-to-energy plant was planned to be set up at the village for producing energy from the waste produce of Machilipatnam Municipality.

See also 
List of villages in Krishna district

References 

Villages in Krishna district